The European Youth Chess Championship is organized by the European Chess Union (ECU) in groups under 8, 10, 12, 14, 16 and 18 years old. The first tournament was held in 1991, and the under 8 category was introduced in 2007. Until 2002 there was also a tournament for the under 20 group (see European Junior Chess Championship). There are also specific tournaments for girls only, in the same age categories.

Boys winners
{| class="sortable wikitable"
! Year !! Location !! U8 !! U10 !! U12 !! U14 !! U16 !! U18
|-
| 1991 ||  Mamaia || ||  Adrien Leroy ||  Peter Leko ||  Tomáš Oral ||  Andrei Istrățescu
|-
| 1992 ||  Rimavská Sobota || ||  Krzysztof Gratka ||  Péter Ács  ||  Peter Leko ||  Vadim Zvjaginsev
|-
| 1993 ||  Szombathely || ||  Étienne Bacrot ||  Valeriane Gaprindashvili ||  Erald Dervishi ||  Robert Kempiński 
|-
| 1994 ||  Băile Herculane || ||  Gadir Guseinov ||   Valeriane Gaprindashvili ||  Karl Mah ||  Aliaksei Charnushevich ||  Robert Kempiński 
|-
| 1995 ||  Verdun || ||  Arkadij Naiditsch ||  Étienne Bacrot  ||  Sergey Fedorchuk ||  Pavel Šimáček ||  Robert Kempiński
|-
| 1996 ||  Rimavská Sobota || ||  Teimour Radjabov ||  Yuri Drozdovskij  ||  Evgeni Kobylkin ||  Fabian Doettling ||  Ruslan Ponomariov
|-
| 1997 ||  Tallinn || ||  Teimour Radjabov ||  Ilya Zarezenko ||  Yuri Drozdovskij  ||  Alexander Kundin ||  Mikheil Mchedlishvili
|-
| 1998 ||  Mureck || ||  Dmytro Tishyn ||  Teimour Radjabov ||  Alexander Riazantsev  ||  Gabriel Sargissian  ||  Dennis de Vreugt
|-
| 1999 ||  Litochoro || ||  Sergey Karjakin ||  Borki Predojević ||  Nidjat Mamedov ||  Sergey Grigoriants ||  Teimour Radjabov
|-
| 2000 ||  Kallithea || ||  Ian Nepomniachtchi ||  Evgeny Romanov ||  Mark Erwich ||  Ján Markoš  ||  Artyom Timofeev 
|-
| 2001 ||  Kallithea || ||  Vladimir Onischuk ||  Ian Nepomniachtchi ||  Borki Predojević  ||  Ernesto Inarkiev ||  Zviad Izoria
|-
| 2002 ||  Peñíscola || ||  Eltaj Safarli ||  Ian Nepomniachtchi ||  Evgeny Romanov ||  Aleksandr Kharitonov ||  Shakhriyar Mamedyarov 
|-
| 2003 ||  Budva || ||  Samvel Ter-Sahakyan ||  Eltaj Safarli ||  Sergei Zhigalko ||  Csaba Balogh ||  Mateusz Bartel
|-
| 2004 ||  Ürgüp || ||  Robert Aghasaryan ||  Sanan Sjugirov ||  Giorgi Margvelashvili  ||  Rauf Mamedov ||  Radosław Wojtaszek 
|-
| 2005 ||  Herceg Novi || ||  Konstantin Nikologorskiy ||  Sanan Sjugirov ||  Davit Benidze ||  Zaven Andriasian ||  Paweł Czarnota
|-
| 2006 ||  Herceg Novi || ||  Arseny Shurunov || Ivan Bukavshin ||  Peter Prohaszka ||  Romain Édouard ||  Sergei Zhigalko
|-
| 2007 ||  Šibenik ||  Nikita Ayvazyan ||  Kirill Alekseenko ||  Illia Nyzhnyk ||  Sanan Sjugirov ||  Vugar Rasulov ||  Ivan Šarić
|-
| 2008 ||  Herceg Novi ||  Denizcan Temizkan ||  Cemil Can Ali Marandi ||  Kiprian Berbatov ||  Ivan Bukavshin ||  Illia Nyzhnyk ||  Xavier Vila Gazquez   
|-
| 2009 ||  Fermo ||  Abdulla Gadimbayli ||  Benjamin Gledura ||  Evgeny Zanan ||  Kamil Dragun ||  Gil Popilski ||  Samvel Ter-Sahakyan
|-
| 2010 ||  Batumi ||  Abdulla Gadimbayli ||  Viktor Gažík ||  Cemil Can Ali Marandi ||  Olexandr Bortnyk ||  Ivan Bukavshin ||  Vasif Durarbayli
|-
| 2011 ||  Albena ||  Alex Krstulovic ||  Evgenios Ioannidis ||  Haik M Martirosyan ||  Cemil Can Ali Marandi ||  Olexandr Bortnyk ||  Nils Grandelius
|-
| 2012 ||  Prague ||  Tsvetan Stoyanov ||  Andrey Esipenko ||  Haik M Martirosyan ||  Jan-Krzysztof Duda ||  Kacper Drozdowski ||  Vadim Moiseenko
|-
| 2013 ||  Budva ||  Aydin Suleymanli  ||  Kağan Aydın Çelebi ||  Viktor Matviishen  ||  Jorden Van Foreest  ||  Kirill Alekseenko ||  Vladimir Fedoseev
|-
| 2014 ||  Batumi ||  Ilya Makoveev || Mamikon Gharibyan  || Viktor Matviishen || Timur Fakhrutdinov|| Cemil Can Ali Marandi  || Avital Boruchovsky
|-
| 2015 ||  Poreč || Mikhei Navumenka  || Ilya Makoveev  || Kirill Shubin || Sergei Lobanov|| Leonid Sawlin || Cemil Can Ali Marandi
|-
| 2016 ||  Prague || Artem Pingin|| Volodar Murzin || Mamikon Gharibyan|| Salvador Guerra Rivera   || Timur Fakhrutdinov || Manuel Petrosyan
|-
| 2017 ||  Mamaia || Giang Tran Nam|| Marc Andria Maurizzi || Aydin Suleymanli||  Jonas Buhl Bjerre || Andrey Esipenko|| Jesper Søndergaard Thybo
|-
| 2018 ||  Riga || Jahandar Azadaliyev|| Artem Pingin|| Volodar Murzin|| Stefan Pogosyan|| Francesco Sonis ||  Evgenios Ioannidis
|-
| 2019 ||  Bratislava || Yağız Kaan Erdoğmuş || Savva Vetokhin||| Marc Andria Maurizzi|| Sebastian Kostolanský|| Armen Barseghyan|| Thai Dai Van Nguyen
|-
| 2022 ||  Antalya || Roman Shogdzhiev || Baver Yilmaz|| Patryk Cieslak||| Svyatoslav Bazakutsa|| Timothe Razafindratsima|| Rudik Makarian
|}

Girls winners
{| class="sortable wikitable"
! Year !! Location !! U8 !! U10 !! U12 !! U14 !! U16 !! U18
|-
| 1991 ||  Mamaia || ||  Sabina Popescu ||  Sofiko Tkeshelashvili  ||  Maia Lomineishvili ||  Ilaha Kadimova
|-
| 1992 ||  Rimavská Sobota || ||  Regina Pokorná ||  Alina Tarachowicz ||  Antoaneta Stefanova ||  Inna Gaponenko
|-
| 1993 ||  Szombathely || ||  Viktorija Čmilytė  ||  Iweta Radziewicz ||  Natalia Zhukova  ||  Natalia Kiseleva
|-
| 1994 ||  Băile Herculane || ||  Alexandra Kosteniuk ||  Ana Matnadze  ||  Iweta Radziewicz ||  Natalia Zhukova ||  Mónika Grábics
|-
| 1995 ||  Verdun || ||  Nadezhda Kosintseva ||  Ana Matnadze ||  Cristina Moshina ||  Szidonia Vajda ||  Marta Zielinska
|-
| 1996 ||  Rimavská Sobota || ||  Tatiana Kosintseva ||  Alexandra Kosteniuk ||   Cristina Moshina|| Vladislava Kalinina ||  Monika Bobrowska
|-
| 1997 ||  Tallinn || ||  Nana Dzagnidze ||  Nadezhda Kosintseva  ||  Ana Matnadze  ||  Ekaterina Polovnikova ||  Anna Dorofeeva
|-
| 1998 ||  Mureck || ||  Anna Muzychuk ||  Marie Sebag ||  Lela Javakhishvili ||  Ana Matnadze ||  Dana Reizniece
|-
| 1999 ||  Litochoro || ||  Silvia-Raluca Sgîrcea ||  Nana Dzagnidze  ||  Marie Sebag ||  Ana Matnadze   ||  Dana Reizniece
|-
| 2000 ||  Kallithea || ||  Anna Muzychuk ||  Valentina Gunina ||  Tamara Chistiakova  ||  Natalia Pogonina ||  Nadezhda Kosintseva
|-
| 2001 ||  Kallithea || ||  Alena Tairova  ||  Iozefina Păuleţ ||  Kateryna Lahno ||  Maria Kursova  ||  Inga Charkhalashvili
|-
| 2002 ||  Peñíscola || ||  Mariya Muzychuk ||  Anna Muzychuk ||  Turkan Mamedyarova  ||  Marie Sebag ||  Alina Motoc
|-
| 2003 ||  Budva || ||  Nazí Paikidze ||  Anastasia Bodnaruk ||  Anna Muzychuk  ||  Maria Fominykh ||  Natalia Pogonina
|-
| 2004 ||  Ürgüp || ||  Meri Arabidze  ||  Lara Stock ||  Anna Muzychuk ||  Valentina Gunina ||  Salome Melia
|-
| 2005 ||  Herceg Novi || ||  Varvara Mestnikova ||  Nazí Paikidze ||  Varvara Repina   ||  Inna Ivakhinova ||  Salome Melia
|-
| 2006 ||  Herceg Novi || ||  Daria-Ioana Vişănescu  ||  Meri Arabidze  ||  Varvara Repina  ||  Kübra Öztürk ||  Anna Gasik
|-
| 2007 ||  Šibenik ||  Aydan Hojjatova ||  Cécile Haussernot ||  Aleksandra Lach ||  Nazí Paikidze ||  Kübra Öztürk  ||  Inna Ivakhinova
|-
| 2008 ||  Herceg Novi ||  Gunay Mammadzada ||  Liza Kisteneva ||   Anna Styazhkina ||  Meri Arabidze ||  Nazí Paikidze ||  Kateřina Němcová   
|-
| 2009 ||  Fermo ||  Ece Alkim Erece ||  Anna Vasenina ||   Cécile Haussernot ||  Marsel Efroimski ||  Katarzyna Adamowicz ||  Olga Girya
|-
| 2010 ||  Batumi ||  Gabriela Antova ||  Oliwia Kiolbasa||  Alexandra Goryachkina ||  Ulviyya Fataliyeva ||  Mariam Danelia ||  Keti Tsatsalashvili
|-
| 2011 ||  Albena ||  Nurgyul Salimova ||  Alicja Śliwicka||  Anna Vasenina ||  Aleksandra Goryachkina ||  Maria Severina ||  Diana Baciu
|-
| 2012 ||  Prague ||  Mariya Kutyanina ||  Anastasia Zotova||  Anastasia Avramidou ||  Katsiaryna Beinenson ||  Marja Tantsiura ||  Aleksandra Goryachkina
|-
| 2013 ||  Budva || Laura Czernikowska || Anastasia Vuller  || Polina Shuvalova || Gunay Mammadzada||  Anna Styazhkina  || Nastassia Ziaziulkina
|-
| 2014 ||  Batumi || Emilia Zavivaeva || Malak Ismayil  || Ekaterina Goltseva|| Anastasia Avramidou || Mai Narva  || Ulviyya Fataliyeva
|-
| 2015 ||  Poreč || Veronika Veremyuk   || Galina Mironenko  || Elizaveta Solozhenkina|| Anna Kochukova|| Anna-Maja Kazarian ||  Nino Khomeriki
|-
| 2016 ||  Prague || Alexandra Shvedova|| Zsóka Gaál || Sıla Çağlar || Aleksandra Maltsevskaya|| Fiona Sieber  || Nino Khomeriki
|-
| 2017 ||  Mamaia || Sofya Svergina  || Veronika Shubenkova|| Galina Mironenko || Govhar Beydullayeva ||  Olga Badelka|| Sona Asatryan
|-
| 2018 ||  Riga || Ekaterina Zubkovskaya || Alexandra Shvedova|| Olga Karmanova|| Ayan Allahverdiyeva || Kamaliya Bulatova|| Aleksandra Dimitrova
|-
| 2019 ||  Bratislava || Dinara Huseynova || Anna Shukhman || Alexandra Shvedova|| Ayan Allahverdiyeva|| Patrycja Waszczuk|| Alicja Śliwicka
|-
| 2022 ||  Antalya || Sofya Kokareva || Marianta Lampou|| Diana Preobrazhenskaya|| Valeria Kleymenova|| Mariya Manko|||  Mariam Mkrtchyan 
	
|}

See also
 European Junior Chess Championship
 European Individual Chess Championship
 European Senior Chess Championship
 European Team Chess Championship
 World Junior Chess Championship
 World Youth Chess Championship

References
 European Youth Champions Boys from Italian Chess Federation website : U8, U10, U12, U14, U16, U18
 European Youth Champions Girls from Italian Chess Federation website : U8, U10, U12, U14, U16, U18 
 Complete standings on Chess-Results: 1998 Boys U10, 1998 Boys U12, 1998 Boys U14, 1998 Boys U16, 1998 Boys U18, 1998 Girls U10, 1998 Girls U12, 1998 Girls U14, 1998 Girls U16, 1998 Girls U18, 2000 Boys U10, 2000 Boys U12, 2000 Boys U14, 2000 Boys U16, 2000 Boys U18, 2000 Girls U10, 2000 Girls U12, 2000 Girls U14, 2000 Girls U16, 2000 Girls U18, 2001 Boys U10, 2001 Boys U12, 2001 Boys U14, 2001 Boys U16, 2001 Boys U18, 2001 Girls U10, 2001 Girls U12, 2001 Girls U14, 2001 Girls U16, 2001 Girls U18, 2003, 2006, 2007, 2008, 2009, 2010, 2011, 2012, 2013, 2014, 2015,
 ChessBase reports: 2004, 2005, 2006, 2007

Supranational chess championships
Women's chess competitions
1991 in chess
Chess in Europe